Energoland is an information center for energy and electricity generation which was opened by Slovenské elektrárne on 14 October 2014 at Mochovce, Slovakia, at the site of the nuclear power plant. It is situated between Levice and Nitra. The center mainly serves the schools and public. The entry is free of charge. The exposition was awarded as an excellent communication project at the PIME conference and evaluated as a five-star training center by Laura Elizabeth Kennedy, governor of the United States of America in the Board of Governors of the International Atomic Energy Agency in Vienna and chargé d'affaires of permanent representation of the USA in international organisation in Vienna.

Exposition 
In Energoland, there are more than thirty objects, applications, and interactive expositions. Edutainment (blending education and entertainment) at Mochovce offers information on energy, electricity generation, global warming, and carbon burden. In addition, visitors learn about the energy mix, electricity grid dispatching, or about the radiation around us. The exposition also focuses on power industry, not only with respect to safety and radioactive waste but also dealing with the fuel cycle, nanowolrd of atoms, and Cherenkov radiation. Some of the specialities include the 3D cinema with its own movie Energy Odyssey, a model of emission-free motorcycle, interactive LED floor or thermal mirror, and mobile application using augmented reality, "Energoland", downloadable from Google Play or AppStore. Through the Energy Map, various facts and statistics can be searched which are directly shown in the map of the world with the highlighted countries.
Energoland also wants its visitors to make their own opinion of the electricity generation and its sources. Therefore, it does not provide information only about nuclear energy but it also brings knowledge about other sources: water, sun, wind, geothermal energy, or fossil fuels.

Construction of Energoland 
The design of the building is the work of Ing. arch. Viktor Šabík (BARAK Architekti) who, together with the QEX Company and Italian agency Piter Design, designed the interior of Energoland, as well.[2] The total area of the building, including the training rooms and offices is 2,000 square metres; the info center itself takes up the area of 600 m2.

Other activities 
Energoland is not only a visitor and information center; it also serves as a training center for the employees of Slovenské elektrárne and provides office areas. There are many events for the employees of Slovenské elektrárne or public taking place here, such as the 90 reactor-years anniversary, programme within the national round of Olympics in Physics, Science Talks during the Science and Technology Week, Sustainable Development Conference in May 2015, etc.

References

External links 
 Official webpage of Energoland
 Official page of Slovenské elektrárne

Energy in Slovakia
Electric power in Slovakia